Morteza Pashaei (11 August 1984 – 14 November 2014) was an Iranian musician, composer, and pop singer.

Born and raised in Tehran, Pashaei studied graphic design and was interested in music since his childhood, when he began playing guitar. Less than two decades later, he was diagnosed with stomach cancer in 2013 and hospitalized at Tehran's Bahman Hospital on 3 November 2014. Chemotherapy was administered for the aggressive cancer, but the attempt to slow the cancer failed. His health deteriorated and he died on 14 November 2014, aged 30.

Early life
Morteza Pashaei was born on 11 August 1984 in Aryashahr, Tehran. He was interested in music since his childhood and began playing the guitar at the age of fourteen. In addition to playing the guitar, he also played the piano. He studied graphic design in Islamic Azad University and graduated in 2009"

Music career
Pashaei began his professional music career in 2009 by publishing his songs on the internet, notably YouTube. As an artist, he was known to be quite innovative. He is best known for his Yeki Hast track (2012).

Illness and death
In late September 2013, it was announced that Pashaei was diagnosed with stomach cancer. His relatives denied the news but his official website announced that his planned concerts had been cancelled due to Morteza's illness. He appeared with a hat in a TV show one month later and spoke about his illness. He underwent a major surgery before announcing the news.

On 3 November 2014, Pashaei was transferred to Bahman Hospital and was hospitalized in ICU. His doctor mentioned that until his last moments, Pashaei still had hope and he was looking forward to performing at his first Canadian concert in Toronto on 29 November 2014, which was to be the beginning of his Canadian, and eventually international tour. His friend and fellow singer, Farzad Farzin, agreed to do the concert in his place, and perform all of Pashaei's songs in his honour. After his death, he got a letter of recognition from Canada's minister of citizenship and immigration. In the letter, Pashaei was acknowledged for his efforts to promote Iranian culture in Canada, and for his unique talents that have gained him the reputation as a legend of the Iranian community and around the world. Despite his own illness, he also cared for others as well: he accepted the ALS challenge and donated to the cause, while encouraging his fans and other fellow singers to pitch in to help as well.

He died after a long battle with stomach cancer on 14 November 2014 at the age of 30. His funeral was held on 16 November at Vahdat Hall and he was buried at Behesht-e Zahra in a private ceremony at night. Millions of his fans attended his funeral in an unusual procession and recited his songs while he was being buried. Many celebrities attended his memorial ceremony of which Shahab Moradi was the speaker. His death reunited the Iranian people as they grieved the death of the 30-year-old legend. His funeral gathered the largest crowd in Iran since the protests of the 2009 election.

Discography

Albums

Singles

References

External links
 Morteza Pashaei on iTunes
 Morteza Pashaei on Spotify

1984 births
2014 deaths
People from Tehran
Iranian pop singers
21st-century Iranian male singers
Iranian composers
Iranian male singers
Iranian music arrangers
Iranian singer-songwriters
Deaths from cancer in Iran
Deaths from stomach cancer
Musicians from Tehran
Burials at artist's block of Behesht-e Zahra